Frank Sherwin Bridge is a road bridge spanning the River Liffey in Dublin, Ireland. It joins St. John's Road and the south quays from Heuston Station to Wolfe Tone Quay and Parkgate Street on the Northside.

Designed within Dublin Corporation's "Road Design Division", the bridge is a three-span reinforced concrete structure.

The bridge was opened in 1982 to remove traffic from the much older and narrower Sean Heuston Bridge as part of an extended traffic management project on Dublin's quays. This resulted in reversing the direction of the one-way system on the quays to north quays eastbound/south quays westbound.  Prior to the bridge's opening, the south quays carried all eastbound traffic.  Traffic coming eastbound from Parkgate Street ran via Benburb Street and Mellowes Bridge.  Westbound traffic heading towards St. John's Road West would cross from the north quays via Rory O'Moore Bridge onto Victoria Quay, which had two-way traffic until the Sherwin Bridge opened.  Sean Heuston Bridge had weight restrictions that prohibited truck and/or bus traffic.

The bridge was named for Dublin politician Frank Sherwin (1905–1981).

References

Bridges in Dublin (city)
Bridges completed in 1981